The 2010 IAAF Road Race Label Events were the third edition of the global series of road running competitions given Label status by the International Association of Athletics Federations (IAAF). All five World Marathon Majors had Gold Label status. The series included a total of 57 road races: 24 Gold, 24 Silver and 9 Bronze. In terms of distance, 35 races were marathons, 10 were half marathons, 9 were 10K runs, and 3 were held over other distances.

Races

References

Race calendar
Calendar 2010 IAAF Label Road Races. IAAF. Retrieved 2019-09-22.

2010
IAAF Road Race Label Events